The Winnipeg Bus Terminal was an intercity bus station, located beside the Winnipeg International Airport.

History

Union Bus Depot 

The Union Bus Depot was constructed in the 1930s, opened on December 12, 1936, and operated out of 264 Hargrave St., a site where True North Square development currently stands.

Bus lines that operated from Union Bus Depot were Greyhound Canada, Grey Goose, Eagle (St. Anne), Beaver (Selkirk), Cross Country (Ft. Whyte), Eastern Bus Lines (Birds Hill), Southern (Ste. Adolphe), Sonnichsen (Headingley), Riverbend (Ste. Adolphe), Thiessen (Stonewall, Stony Mountain).

Winnipeg Intercity Bus Terminal 
In December 1962 plans were announced to replace the old Union Bus Depot between Hargrave and Carlton St. to the Winnipeg Bus Terminal fronted on Portage Avenue between Colony and Balmoral Streets and be named the Mall Centre. It was designed by architectural firm of Moody, Moore, Whenham and Partners, architects of the Centennial Concert Hall a few years later, along with Edmonton-based John McIntosh. The new bus terminal would be able to park up to 15 intercity buses at once.

PCL began demolition of existing building(s) at the site began in the spring of 1963.

The Mall Centre and Bus Depot opened on October 15, 1964. It covers  along with the Mall Centre Hotel. The 'Park-M-All' for up to 400 vehicles was included in the development. A Dutch Treat Cafeteria was the initial fast food restaurant that set up shop in the Bus Depot.

For several years, Salisbury House restaurant a small convenience store operated from the bus terminal

In 1980s the Mall Centre Hotel was demolished to make way for the 160-room Relax Plaza (360 Colony St.) which was constructed in 1986, and later branded as a Holiday Inn Downtown and apartment complex.

Winnipeg James Richardson International Airport 
The terminal moved operations on August 15, 2009, where it had been for 45 years.

The terminal was a hub for Greyhound, with buses originating from and travelling to Vancouver; Edmonton; Calgary; Medicine Hat; and Toronto. On October 30, 2018, Greyhound Canada stopped serving western Canada, causing the closure of the bus terminal. The terminal building was demolished in 2022.

Repurposing Mall Centre Bus Depot 

Today, the old Winnipeg Bus Terminal on Portage Avenue has become Balmoral Station and functions as a termination or pass-thru point for Winnipeg Transit buses. A University of Winnipeg Student Centre currently occupies all of the space within the office complex (491 Portage Ave.).

Successor 
Most regional bus lines and inter-provincial lines like Ontario Northland Transportation Commission and Rider Express use Maple Bus Lines terminal at 936 Sherbrook St (transit connection: Route 29 - Sherbrook - Stafford), and ONTC and Rider Express arrives Southdale Shopping Centre at 147 Vermillion Rd also.

See also 
Selkirk Transit

Greyhound Canada

Further reading 

 Cavanagh, Dennis; Wyatt, David A., Regiec, Alex (2006). Dusty Trails to Divided Highways: A History of Intercity Bus Lines in Manitoba. Winnipeg. Rest Stop. .

References

Greyhound Bus-Terminal: Analysis of Options for the Winnipeg Downtown Terminal Final Report. Institute of Urban Studies. 2006. uwinnipeg.ca

Bus stations in Manitoba
Buildings and structures in Winnipeg
Transport in Winnipeg
Transport infrastructure completed in 2009
Former bus stations
2009 establishments in Manitoba
2018 disestablishments in Manitoba
Winnipeg Transit